Milton Keynes Central railway station serves Milton Keynes and surrounding parts of Bedfordshire, Buckinghamshire and Northamptonshire (England). The station is served by Avanti West Coast intercity services, and by West Midlands Trains regional services. 

This is the principal station for the city, one of seven serving the Milton Keynes urban area. Milton Keynes Central, which opened on 17 May 1982,  is by far the busiest and most important of these, as well as being the largest in terms of platforms in use, having overtaken  when platforms 2A and 6 became operational.

History and development

A new station for Milton Keynes
A new station to delimit the western end of the new central business district of Milton Keynes was a key objective for Milton Keynes Development Corporation (MKDC). In the cash-strapped circumstances of the 1960s and 1970s, British Rail (BR) was unenthusiastic but eventually came round after a deal was done in 1978 on cost sharing. In 1979, MKDC architect Stuart Mosscrop designed the station building and office blocks to either side, framing a new Station Square and the vista uphill along Midsummer Boulevard (and the midsummer sunrise).

Opening
The station opened on 14 May 1982, with an official opening by Charles, then-Prince of Wales  conducted three days later. The adjacent office wings were completed three years later. Before Milton Keynes Central opened, Bletchley was the main station for Milton Keynes, served by British Rail InterCity services. These services moved to the new station, downgrading Bletchley.

2006–08 developments
In May 2006, the Department of Transport announced a plan to upgrade the station. The first phase added a down fast line platform 6, so that the existing platform 5 could be used for stopping express trains in either direction. The second phase provided an additional terminating bay platform (2A), nominally to extend the Marston Vale Line / service via the West Coast Main Line (WCML) to Milton Keynes Central. This 5-car bay platform is indented into platform 1. The original bay platform 1 line was extended northwards to become a through platform (becoming the up slow line), and platform 2 line is now a terminating and reversing line, avoiding conflicting crossing movements. This work was completed on 29 December 2008. , a direct service between Bedford and Milton Keynes Central is not in any published plan, being overtaken by later events (see next).

Platforms and layout 

Milton Keynes Central has a total of seven platforms. Platforms 1 and 3 are the south and northbound slow platforms, while 4 and 6 are the south and northbound fast platforms.  Platforms 2 and 5 are reversible, being slow and fast respectively.  Platform 2 is used mainly by terminating stopping services from London Euston, whilst platforms 1 and 3 are used by West Midlands Trains services between Euston and Northampton, Birmingham New Street or Crewe. Platforms 4, 5 and 6 are used by Avanti West Coast inter-city express services between London and the West Midlands, north Wales, the north-west or Scotland. 

Meanwhile, platform 2A is used only by exception when additional platform capacity is needed, such as when there is a service delay. To the north of the station the six lines reduce to four (two slow and two fast) and there is a mile of five-track running to the south before this also reduces back to four. 

The station is generally accessible: there are no unavoidable steps and there are lifts from the concourse to each platform.  As with all mainline railway stations, passengers with mobility limitations may need to pre-book assistance to get from the platform to the train. Ticket gates are in operation.

Local facilities and interchange 
The station building has a shop and café. There are other shops and restaurants on the south side of the station square. There are a number of hotels on Midsummer Boulevard (which begins opposite the station and leads up into the central business district). 

The station forecourt is the terminus or key intermediate destination for many bus services; almost all local and district bus services stop there. These services are operated mostly by Arriva Shires & Essex as well as some routes by Stagecoach East and a number of independent operators. Numerous bus services each hour traverse Midsummer Boulevard, connecting the station to the shopping centre, the theatre and Xscape.

Stagecoach East operate four major long-distance coach routes from here. Their route 99 express service runs to Luton Airport via Luton railway station, providing a direct link between the West Coast Main Line and the Midland Main Line. Route X5 route between Oxford and Bedford stops here, as do their X4 and X7 interurban bus routes to Northampton, Leicester and Peterborough. Arriva Shires & Essex also operate route X60 to Aylesbury, which terminates at the station.

The Milton Keynes redway system, a comprehensive network of cycle/pedestrian shared use paths, connects to the station and its cycle parking facilities.

Also in the station forecourt, there is a taxi rank (to the left on exit) and a pick-up space for private hire cars (to the right), plus limited (very) short term parking. There are multi-storey car-parks to the north and south of the station. Parking in the surrounding streets is heavily restricted to discourage commuter parking. 

The station square itself is a favourite site for skateboarding and freestyle BMX and as a result the granite facings of the planting surrounds have suffered from the continuous bumping and grinding. This has lessened somewhat since the opening of a dedicated skateboarding park (Sk8 MK) close to the former central bus station.

Services

Current services

London Northwestern Railway 
The typical off-peak service provided by London Northwestern Railway is:
 1 tph to 
 2 tph to  via 

Avanti West Coast 
Many Avanti West Coast inter-city services call here, with three calls an hour in each direction off-peak on weekdays:

Future services

East West Rail

Former services

Connex South Central
In June 1997, Connex South Central began operating services between Gatwick Airport and Rugby via the Brighton and West London Lines that called at Milton Keynes Central with Class 319s. It was cut back to terminate at Milton Keynes in December 2000 before being withdrawn in May 2002 due to capacity constraints on the West Coast Main Line while the latter was being upgraded.

Southern 
Southern reintroduced the service in February 2009 with Class 377s initially operating to and from Brighton to Milton Keynes Central, before being curtailed at its southern end at South Croydon and later Clapham Junction. In May 2022, Southern cut its service back to terminate at Watford Junction, where passengers may transfer to Avanti West Coast or London Northwestern services to stations north of Watford.

Service summary

Location

The station is at the western end of Central Milton Keynes, near the junction of the A5 with the A509. The station post-code is MK9 1LA.

In film 

The station and its plaza were used in the 1987 movie Superman IV: The Quest for Peace as a substitute for the United Nations building. Other scenes were shot in the Central Milton Keynes area.

References

Notes

External links 

 Pendolino rounds Wolverton bend before coming to a stop at Milton Keynes Central

Railway stations in Buckinghamshire
DfT Category B stations
Railway stations in Milton Keynes
Railway stations opened by British Rail
Railway stations in Great Britain opened in 1982 
Railway stations served by Avanti West Coast
Railway stations served by West Midlands Trains
1982 establishments in England
Buildings and structures in Milton_Keynes
East West Rail
Stations on the West Coast Main Line